Garron DuPree (born December 4, 1989) is a bass guitarist and recording engineer from Texas. DuPree began his career as a professional musician in 2005 at the age of 15 as the bassist for the group Eisley, and became the bassist for Say Anything in 2013. DuPree is also a recording engineer as well as a session musician.

Personal life

Garron was born in Houston, TX. and was raised in the surrounding cities of Richmond, and Sugar Land, Texas. He is the 2nd of 5 children from his mother, Parrish DuPree, and father, Wade DuPree. Surrounded by the more rural environments of Texas, Garron grew up in the country side owning several horses. He is a self-proclaimed Christian, along with the majority of his family, and grew up participating and playing music at his church in Texas. He married his girlfriend of nearly 10 years, Madeline DuPree, in July, 2014.

Career
Garron DuPree joined the group Eisley in 2005 at the age of 15, following the departure of their former bassist Jonathan Wilson. He is the cousin of the group's remaining members Chauntelle DuPree, Stacy DuPree, Weston DuPree, and Sherri DuPree. At the time of Garron's arrival with the Texas-based indie-pop band, they were entering a phase of heavy touring in support of their debut album Room Noises. Garron toured as Eisley's bassist beginning with the group's 2005 Yahoo sponsored "Who's Next?" tour, followed closely by 2005's Austin City Limits festival and closing out the year with Switchfoot's Nothing Is Sound tour. Eisley continued touring throughout 2006, visiting Australia in support of Taking Back Sunday, touring the United States with supporting band Dawes for their first major headlining tour, as well as touring Europe. Garron's bass work with Eisley began on their second full-length record, Combinations, and has remained the sole bassist on the remainder of Eisley's recordings to date. In 2013, Garron expanded his repertoire when he joined Say Anything as their bassist, replacing touring bassist Adam Siska. His bass work has been said to be inspired by Radiohead, Kent, Pink Floyd, the Beatles, and Matt Rubano, among others.

DuPree has additionally become known as a recording engineer in more recent years, beginning commercially with his work on Eisley's fourth studio LP, Currents. Most notably, he is known for his engineering work on that album, as well as Merriment's debut album, Sway, and Say Anything's sixth studio album Hebrews.

Currents 2012-2013

DuPree began work alongside Eisley band member Weston DuPree and technician Mark Schwartzkopf in the design and building of Eisley's own studio after the group's departure from Warner Brothers Records in 2011. The studio was designed, in early 2012, and construction began that April. Upon its completion, the group immediately began the production and recording of their fourth full-length record.

Production continued throughout the remainder of the year, marking Eisley's most extensive length of time spent recording a single album since their inception. Production was paused once, to accommodate the group's Mid-Summer Tour in June–July 2012. The recording process was finished by late October 2012, and final arrangements were completed before mix engineer and multi-instrumentalist Jeremy Larson mixed and mastered the album. Currents was released on May 28, 2013 to almost unanimously positive reviews - peaking at #66 on the Billboard 200 charts, making it the group's highest charting album to date.

Sway 2013 

Following the recording of Currents, Garron was brought in to engineer the debut album by the group Merriment. The record was produced by Charlie Brand, front-man for the indie-pop group Miniature Tigers. Production of the record was completed within two weeks, and was recorded at Eisley's studio in Tyler, TX. DuPree was credited as Engineer for the album, and also contributed his bass guitar skills on the track "Patterns." He also performed the strings on the track "Right Again."

Sway was released on April 8, 2014. The record reached #3 on the iTunes singer-songwriter charts, and received generally positive reviews for the band's debut release.

Hebrews 2013-2014 

Hebrews, the sixth studio album by American pop-punk band Say Anything, was recorded and engineered by DuPree in Tyler, TX throughout late 2013 and early 2014. DuPree also is credited for all of the bass work on the album. DuPree officially joined Say Anything as a bassist in 2013 and quickly adapted to a more punk-rock influenced role. DuPree also embarked on tour with the group in summer 2014 in support of Hebrews. The tour was included openers The Front Bottoms, the So-So Glo's, and You Blew It!, and was said to be among the group's most successful tours to date.

DuPree's work on Hebrews represents his first recorded venture into the indie-punk/pop-punk style characterized by Say Anything. Previously Garron's work was focused on the more whimsical style of his primary work in Eisley, featuring slower, more melodically focused bass rhythms working in tandem with the accent-rich drumming of the group.

Touring 

According to Garron's official website, he played "over 600 live shows, in over 340 venues, across 166 different cities, in 4 different countries" as of 2015. In 2014, DuPree embarked on a headlining tour with Say Anything in support of their album Hebrews. Joining Say Anything on stage as touring members were ex-Taking Back Sunday member Fred Mascherino, Moneen frontman Kenny Bridges, and Moving Mountains frontman Greg Dunn. Coincidentally, Garron had toured with each of these additional musicians separately during his extensive touring with Eisley.

Discography 

Music Videos

Charting Album Positions and Credits

References

External links 
 
 
 Official Eisley MySpace page

1989 births
Living people
Musicians from Houston
Guitarists from Texas
American male bass guitarists
People from Richmond, Texas
People from Sugar Land, Texas
21st-century American bass guitarists
21st-century American male musicians
Say Anything (band) members